Romuald Traugutt (16 January 1826 – 5 August 1864) was a Polish general and war hero best known for commanding the January Uprising of 1863. From October 1863 to August 1864 he was the leader of the insurrection. He headed the Polish national government from 17 October 1863 to 20 April 1864, and was president of its Foreign Affairs Office.

Traugutt was born on the Šastakova estate in Hrodna Governorate of the Russian Empire (nowadays the village of Šastakova in Kamenets District of Belarus). He graduated from the Svislač Gymnasium in 1842 and joined the army.

Before the uprising he was a Lieutenant Colonel in the Russian army, where he won distinction in the Crimean War. He retired from the army in 1862 and became involved with Polish nationalists. After leading a partisan unit in the initial rebellion, he became leader of the rebel forces in October 1863.

After the uprising failed, Traugutt was betrayed by Artur Goldman and sentenced to death by the Russian court. He was hanged near the Warsaw Citadel on 5 August 1864, aged 38, together with the rebel commanders Rafał Krajewski, Józef Toczyski, Roman Żuliński and Jan Jeziorański. The Roman Catholic Church is considering his beatification due to his overwhelming devotion to God and sacrifice for his homeland Poland. One of his early biographers has been the Marian Father, Józef Jarzębowski (1897-1964), who devoted three volumes to Traugutt's life and work.

Remembrance

In 1916, a monument was raised in Warsaw on the site of his execution, and in 1925, the area around it was dedicated as Traugutt Park.
In 1945, he was honored on the first postage stamp of the newly re-emerged Republic of Poland as part of a three-stamp set honoring national heroes. He had been earlier honored on a stamp in the 1938 set for the 20th anniversary of Poland's independence after World War I. Poland issued additional stamps in his honor in 1962 and 1963.  He was also commemorated on the Polish 20 złoty banknote of the 1980s.

The high school in Częstochowa is named after him, and a memorial column to him was erected in 1933 in Ciechocinek.

There is also a monument to Traugutt in the town of Svislač in Belarus.

Notes

Bibliography
 Józef Jarzębowski. Traugutt, nakładem Archidiecezjalnego Instytutu Akcji Katolickiej, Warszawa, 1938.
 Józef Jarzębowski. Węgierska polityka Traugutta: na podstawie znanych i nieznanych dokumentów. Warszawa 1939. ("Traugutt's Hungarian policies").
 Józef Jarzębowski. Traugutt: dokumenty, listy, wspomnienia, wypisy. Londyn: Veritas, 1970.

External links 

 Romuald Traugutt High School - Częstochowa, Poland

1826 births
1864 deaths
People from Kamenets District
People from Brestsky Uyezd
Polish Roman Catholics
Members of Polish government (January Uprising)
January Uprising participants
Polish generals
Polish people of the Crimean War (Russian side)
Generals of the January Uprising
Polish people executed by the Russian Empire
Executed Polish people
People executed by the Russian Empire by hanging
Executed Belarusian people
Polish Servants of God